The 2022–23 season is the 127th season in the history of FC Schaffhausen and their 9th consecutive season in the second division. The club are participating in Swiss Challenge League and the Swiss Cup. The season covers the period from 1 July 2022 to 30 June 2023.

Players

Pre-season and friendlies

Competitions

Overall record

Swiss Challenge League

League table

Results summary

Results by round

Matches 
The league fixtures were announced on 17 June 2022.

Swiss Cup

References 

Schaffhausen